Made in California (1962–2012) is a compilation box set by the Beach Boys, released on August 27, 2013. The set, released through Capitol Records, was designed by Mark London in a form emulating a high school yearbook. The set contains six CDs with tracks that span the band's entire career, including outtakes, demos, B-sides, rarities, alternate takes and versions, plus over 60 previously unreleased. It supersedes the theretofore career-spanning 1993 box set Good Vibrations: Thirty Years of The Beach Boys, which followed a similar premise.

Background 
Originally announced for a 2012 release, alongside the two-disc compilation album Fifty Big Ones, the box set was ultimately delayed. In Spring 2013 an August 27 release date was confirmed, and on June 11, the artwork and track list was revealed.

Much of the box set features unreleased work by the Wilson brothers Dennis and Carl, which the surviving members were said to have "pushed for." Dennis' song "(Wouldn't It Be Nice to) Live Again" was especially anticipated toward the release of the box set.

Some previously bootlegged unreleased tracks were left out of the compilation due to the group being uncomfortable with their contents. These included: "Stevie" (a 1981 Brian Wilson composition allegedly written about Stevie Nicks), "My Solution" (a Halloween-themed recording made on October 31, 1970 about a mad scientist), "Carry Me Home" (a Dennis Wilson song containing the lyrics "please God don't take my life"), "Thank Him" (a solo 1963 Brian Wilson demo), and "Walkin'" (a late-1960s Brian Wilson song with an abandoned vocal take).

Promotional contest
To promote the album, fans were given the opportunity to contribute to the production of a music video for the previously unreleased track "California Feelin'" via Tongal. The same service offered fans the chance to submit a lead guitar track for "Goin' to the Beach", with the winner's performance mixed into the song by Mark Linett and Alan Boyd. The winner was also awarded a custom guitar. A downloadable version of "Goin' to the Beach" was made available on July 22, 2013 as an incentive for pre-ordering the box-set.

Track listing 
Original stereo mixes unless otherwise noted. Tracks marked ♦ are exclusive to Made in California. All tracks written by Brian Wilson and Mike Love except where noted.

References

The Beach Boys compilation albums
2013 compilation albums
Capitol Records compilation albums
Compilation albums published posthumously